The Anderson River is a tributary of the Fraser River in the Canadian province of British Columbia.

The river is presumably named after Alexander Caulfield Anderson of the Hudson's Bay Company who traveled through the region in 1847–48.

Course
The Anderson River originates near Coquihalla Pass and flows generally west and north, joining the Fraser River in the Fraser Canyon, near Boston Bar.

See also
List of British Columbia rivers

References

Rivers of British Columbia
Fraser Canyon
Tributaries of the Fraser River
Yale Division Yale Land District